Alcony is an unincorporated community in Miami County, in the U.S. state of Ohio.

History
Alcony was laid out in 1858. A post office called Alcony was established in 1868, and remained in operation until 1920. A variant name was Miami City.

References

Unincorporated communities in Miami County, Ohio
Unincorporated communities in Ohio